Prototype is the debut studio album by BWO. It was released in Russia in November 2004, and in Sweden on March 9, 2005. It peaked at number 2 on the Swedish Albums Chart.

Track listing

Charts

References

External links
 

2004 debut albums
BWO (band) albums